Narong Nilploy (born 22 October 1979) is a Thai sprinter. He competed in the men's 4 × 400 metres relay at the 2000 Summer Olympics.

References

1979 births
Living people
Athletes (track and field) at the 2000 Summer Olympics
Narong Nilploy
Narong Nilploy
Southeast Asian Games medalists in athletics
Place of birth missing (living people)
Narong Nilploy
Narong Nilploy
Narong Nilploy
Athletes (track and field) at the 1998 Asian Games
Athletes (track and field) at the 2002 Asian Games
Competitors at the 2001 Southeast Asian Games
Narong Nilploy
Narong Nilploy
Narong Nilploy